Legacy: The Absolute Best is a two-disc compilation album by American rock band the Doors. Released in 2003, it includes the uncensored versions of both "Break On Through (To the Other Side)" and "The End". Also included is a previously unreleased studio version of Morrison's epic poetry piece "Celebration of the Lizard," a rehearsal outtake from the band's Waiting for the Sun sessions.

Critical reception

Legacy: The Absolute Best has received perfect ratings in scales from both The New Rolling Stone Album Guide, and AllMusic. The latter's critic, Stephen Thomas Erlewine, notes in his review:

Track listing
All tracks are written by the Doors (John Densmore, Robby Krieger, Ray Manzarek, Jim Morrison), except where noted. Details are taken from the 2003 U.S. Elektra/Rhino CD with discographical annotation by Gary Peterson, except running times, which are taken from the AllMusic review. Other releases may show different information.

Disc one
"Break On Through (To the Other Side)" – 2:29
"Back Door Man" (Willie Dixon, Chester Burnett) – 3:34
"Light My Fire" – 7:08
"Twentieth Century Fox" – 2:33
"The Crystal Ship" – 2:34
"Alabama Song (Whisky Bar)" (Bertolt Brecht, Kurt Weill) – 3:19
"Soul Kitchen" – 3:35
"The End" – 11:46
"Love Me Two Times" – 3:16
"People Are Strange" – 2:12
"When the Music's Over" – 11:02
"My Eyes Have Seen You" – 2:29
"Moonlight Drive" – 3:04
"Strange Days" – 3:09
"Hello, I Love You" – 2:16
"The Unknown Soldier" – 3:25
"Spanish Caravan" – 3:01
"Five to One" – 4:27
"Not to Touch the Earth" – 3:54

Original releases
Tracks 1-8 from The Doors (1967) 
Tracks 9-14 from Strange Days (1967)
Tracks 15-19 from Waiting for the Sun (1968)

Disc two
"Touch Me" (Krieger) – 3:12
"Wild Child" (Morrison) – 2:38
"Tell All the People" (Krieger) – 3:21
"Wishful Sinful" (Krieger) – 2:58
"Roadhouse Blues" (Morrison, the Doors) – 4:04
"Waiting for the Sun" (Morrison) – 4:00
"You Make Me Real" (Morrison) – 2:53
"Peace Frog" (Krieger, Morrison) – 2:58
"Love Her Madly" – 3:18
"L.A. Woman" – 7:51
"Riders on the Storm" – 7:10
"The WASP (Texas Radio and the Big Beat)" – 4:15
"The Changeling" – 4:21
"Gloria" (Van Morrison) – 6:18
"Celebration of the Lizard" (Morrison) – 17:01

Original releases
Tracks 1-4 from The Soft Parade (1969)
Tracks 5-8 from Morrison Hotel (1970)
Tracks 9-13 from L.A. Woman (1971)
Track 14 from Alive, She Cried (1983)
Track 15 previously unreleased (2003)

Personnel
Per liner notes:

The Doors
Jim Morrisonvocals
Ray Manzarekkeyboards
Robby Kriegerguitar
John Densmoredrums

Technical
Bruce Botnickremastering, engineering
Jac Holzmanproduction supervisor

Certifications

References

The Doors compilation albums
2003 greatest hits albums
Elektra Records compilation albums
Rhino Records compilation albums